Instalaciones de Tiro con Arco Altos de Samán are archery facilities in Cabo Rojo, Puerto Rico. They were finished in 2010 and hosted the archery events for the 2010 Central American and Caribbean Games.

References

2010 Central American and Caribbean Games venues
2010 establishments in Puerto Rico
Sports venues completed in 2010